The bock-a-da-bock is a musical instrument in the percussion family consisting of two small cymbals attached to each other by a set of metal tongs. They are typically played in a pair by one percussionist, much like the castanets. However, several other instruments of this type are also referred to as bock-a-da-bocks, such as the squash cymbal and the hand-sock cymbal.

Origin 
The predecessor of the bock-a-da-bock, the Ludwig Gladstone cymbal, was invented by Billy Gladstone and produced by the Ludwig Drum Company. Both the Ludwig Drum Company and their competitors elaborated upon Gladstone's design and produced a diversity of hand-held cymbals, including the bock-a-da-bock. The bock-a-da-bock is listed as a product of the Ludwig Drum Company in their 1928 catalog.

Technique and use 
The bock-a-da-bock is typically played in a pair like castanets, with one set of cymbals in each hand. There are other instruments like the bock-a-da-bock, such as the squash cymbal and hand-sock cymbal in the Ludwig Drum Company line. Though they are similar in construction, each are played differently. The hand-sock cymbal is mounted on spring loaded scissor tongs and is played by squeezing the tongs together. The squash cymbals, which are mounted on a simple fire tong, are held in one hand and hit with a drumstick in the other hand.

Due to recording limitations in the 1920s, the bock-a-da-bock was sometimes used as a substitute for a trap kit. As the trap kit developed into the modern drum kit around the 1930's, the bock-a-da-bock lost favor with the musicians of the time when compared to foot pedal operated hi-hats.

Players 
Noteworthy players of the bock-a-da-bock are Kaiser Marshall, who played it on several Fletcher Henderson records, and  Zutty Singleton from Louis Armstrong's Hot Five who played a bock-a-da-bock on Armstrong's 1928 recording of "Sugar Foot Strut" (featured prominently in the introduction and ending)  and "West End Blues".

Examples of bock-a-da-bock use in charts 
"Black and Tan Fantasy" by Duke Ellington (1927)
"Sugar Foot Strut" by Louis Armstrong (1928)
"West End Blues" by Louis Armstrong (1928)
"A Monday Date" by Louis Armstrong (1928)
Video of a squash cymbal bock-a-da-bock

References

Idiophones
North American percussion instruments
Bebop